Cheema Kalan is a village in Phillaur in Jalandhar district of Punjab State, India. In the Persian language, Kalan is translated as 'big' and Khurd is translated as 'small'. Cheema Kalan is situated beside Cheema Khurd.
The village is administrated by Sarpanch, an elected representative of the village.

Demography 
, The village has a total number of 326 houses and the population of 1465 of which 751 are males while 714 are females.  According to the report published by Census India in 2011, out of the total population of the village 583 people are from Schedule Caste and the village does not have any Schedule Tribe population so far.

See also
List of villages in India

References

External links 
 Tourism of Punjab
 Census of Punjab

Villages in Jalandhar district